Nature’s Beckon is an independent environmental activist group of Northeast India which initiated the environmental movement of Assam. It has been doing some tremendous jobs in the arena of environmental concerns of the region from the 1980s till date.

The organization was established by Ashoka Fellow Soumyadeep Datta in the year 1982. The organization has been doing vital works in the field of conservation of wildlife, awareness creation, environmental education, scientific research and documentation and socio-economic development of the forest fringe villages. In 1991, the organization formally registered under societies Registration Act.Nature’s Beckon is deeply involved in protecting the wildlife as well as their habitats. The organization believes in holistic habitat conservation of biodiversity-rich areas through multi structural activism. 

The organization is credited by the discovery of the golden languar (Presbytis geei) in the hill reserves of Chakrashila. Apart from that, the organization spearheaded the conservation movements of Assam such as the Chakrashila Wildlife Sanctuary Movement and the Rain forest Conservation Movement of Assam.The organization's activism has been instrumental for declaring important habitats of Wildlife and biodiversity as a protected area (Wildlife Sanctuaries and National Park) such as the Chakrashila Wildlife Sanctuary and Dehing Patkai Wildlife Sanctuary. 

Awareness programs are undertaken by the organization to impart environmental education to students, environmental activists, educators, NGO members, forest field workers and common villagers. With its dedicated members and expertise and by using its network with grassroots NGOs, voluntary organizations, individuals and academicians, Nature’s Beckon works to conserve wildlife and rain forests of Northeast India.

Formation  

Nature's Beckon, in the beginning was started as a Nature Club by  Soumyadeep Datta at a very young age in 1982, which involved mainly young enthusiasts and local youths. Led by him, the organization at first went on nature-trails and bird-watching expeditions in the Dhubri Forests. Some senior nature lovers like Kamal Narayan Choudhury provided guidance and helped them expand their activities.

Logo 
The logo of Nature's Beckon represents the golden langur (Presbytis geei), a species Nature's Beckon first discovered in the hill forests of Chakrashila of Assam at a very age by the members of the NGO and worked for its conservation.

Objectives 

 Preservation of Forests and Wildlife through people’s participation
 Afforestation and conservation of biodiversity of the hot-spot areas along with the cultivation of traditional food plants of forest villagers
 Rain forest Conservation of North-East India
 To create environmental awareness among the people in general
 To impart environmental education to students and youths for developing trained manpower for conservation work
 To spread the philosophy associated with conservation
 To work for social justice.

Mission Statement 
“The mission of Nature’s Beckon is working with the people to conserve, protect and increase wildlife, plants and their habitats for the continuing benefit of the people of India.”

Activities and Achievements

1. Chakrashila Wildlife Sanctuary Movement and Conservation of Golden Languar 

Nature's Beckon took up a 12 year long conservation movement, through people's participation for the declaration of the Chakrashila Wildlife Sanctuary, making it a major success story in the conservationist movement of Assam. The organization after discovering the presence of Golden Languar in the hill reserves of Chakrashila worked for its protection by a movement in the grassroot level which involved local people, sensitization, awareness, surveys and research, lobbying and other forms of activism of various levels.

2. Rainforest Conservation Movement of Assam and the Declaration of Dehing Patkai Wildlife Sanctuary 
Nature's Beckon rediscovered and highlighted the presence of contiguous rain forests in the Dibrugarh-Tinsukia districts of Upper Assam and undertook a movement for the legal protection of a 500 sq.km of contiguous rainforest. This movement started with baseline surveys of the region by the organization and activism of various forms at  multistructural levels. This is the most famous conservation movement in the region and was in fact the first ever rainforest movement in Assam. The conservation movement taken by Nature's Beckon forced the state government in 13 June 2004 to declare 111.19 sq.km of rainforest as 'Dehing Patkai Wildlife Sanctuary.'  This was another and a major success story in the conservation history of India.

This achievement of the group involved almost a decade long struggle (1995–2004) of the activists associated with it. However, the group considered this achievement only as the partial fulfillment of its objectives and claims that the connected rain forests area of Dibrugarh and Tinsukia district are occupying around 500 sq km, which constitute the only surviving largest in separate‘ forest areas of the Brahmaputra valley. The organization still demands  and works for the area extension of the Dehing Patkai Wildlife Sanctuary, saying that the Dehing Patkai Wildlife Sanctuary should constitute the entire contiguous rain forest.

3. Curbing of Wildlife Crime and Biodiversity Conservation 

Nature's Beckon works for the curbing of wildlife crime by working as a pressure group, through environmental activism and rescue.

4. Holistic Conservation of Biodiversity rich areas 
Nature's Beckon works for the holistic conservation of biodiversity rich areas such as Poba, Chakrashila, and Dehing Patkai.

5. Youth Training, Capacity building and Awareness and research 

Nature's Beckon since its inception has been training and mobilizing youths to work towards conservation and research, through various methods. Keeping the main aim as conservation, Nature's Beckon focuses on eco-tourism, children awareness training and building up a social change among the common masses. Awareness is created by the NGO through various clubs, materials and publications.

External links 
 Nature's Beckon Website

References 

Organisations based in Assam
Organizations established in 1982
1982 establishments in Assam
Ashoka Fellows